Changing Lanes is an American reality series that aired from September 10 until October 20, 2010.

Premise
Women and minorities compete for a spot on a NASCAR team.

Cast
Jonathan Smith as co-host
Michael Cherry as co-host
Ludacris as narrator

Episodes

References

External links
 
TV Guide
 

2010 American television series debuts
2010 American television series endings
2010s American reality television series
English-language television shows
BET original programming